In the historical practice of the Catholic Church, a lay cardinal was a man whom the pope appointed to the College of Cardinals while still a layman. This appointment carried with it the obligation to be ordained to a clerical order, meaning that "lay cardinal" was not a permanent state, but a term in reference to a man who was appointed cardinal prior to taking on the clerical state corresponding to that appointment.

The current law of the Catholic Church is that a man must be first ordained at least a priest in order to be considered for appointment as a cardinal.

List of laymen who were created cardinals

Discontinuation 

In 1917, Pope Pius X promulgated the first edition of the Code of Canon Law, which included a provision that a man must be first ordained a priest prior to being considered for appointment as a cardinal.

According to The New York Times, Pope Paul VI considered making the French Catholic philosopher Jacques Maritain a cardinal in 1965.

See also 
 Crown cardinal
 Cardinal-Infante (disambiguation)
 Cardinal-nephew
 List of creations of cardinals

References 

^
Lists of cardinals